Lili Bosse ( Toren) is an American politician serving as the 82nd and current mayor of Beverly Hills, California.

Before her current term, she also served as the mayor of Beverly Hills from March 2014 to March 2015 and March 2017 to March 2018.

Early life 
Lili Bosse (née Toren) was born October 6, 1961 and grew up in Rego Park, Queens, New York City, until age nine, when she moved to Beverly Hills. She is the only child of Holocaust survivors. Her parents met in Israel shortly after World War II and decided to immigrate to the United States. Her father, Jack Toren, died in 1993. Her mother, Rosalia (Orenstein) Toren, born in Poland, escaped from the Auschwitz concentration camp and wrote two books about her experiences: Destiny in 1991 and A New Beginning in 1997; she died in February 2015.

Bosse graduated from the University of Southern California.

Political career 
Bosse served on the Beverly Hills Traffic and Parking Commission from 1997 to 2002, and on the Beverly Hills Planning Commission from 2007 to 2011. She was elected to a four-year term on the five-member Beverly Hills City Council in 2011. She was appointed by the City Council to serve a one-year term as vice mayor in 2013, and then for a succeeding one-year term as mayor in 2014.

Bosse was sworn in as mayor by actor Sidney Poitier in a ceremony at the Wallis Annenberg Center for the Performing Arts on March 25, 2014. Poitier had also sworn her in as vice mayor in 2013. One of her first actions as Mayor was to announce a "Healthy City Initiative", which aimed to make Beverly Hills "the healthiest city in the world".

In early May 2014, Bosse welcomed a resolution passed by the Beverly Hills City Council to urge the Sultan of Brunei, Hassanal Bolkiah, to sell the Beverly Hills Hotel after he had passed legislation in Brunei to impose Islamic Sharia law there, including the death penalty for adultery and gay sex. She added that she had made a "personal decision" not to return to the hotel until the situation had been solved.

From May 25 to June 3, 2014, Bosse visited China as part of a mayoral delegation trip. She met officials in Beijing, Wuhan, Hongan, Guangzhou, and Jieyang to promote trade between China and Beverly Hills, especially its luxury industry.

In March 2017, Bosse began her second term as the mayor of Beverly Hills. She announced the renewal of her weekly "Walk With the Mayor" program and a new partnership between the City of Beverly Hills and author Deepak Chopra. By August 2017, Bosse introduced Beverly Hills Open Later Days (BOLD) which encouraged local businesses to stay open later into the evening, especially on Rodeo Drive.

Bosse was reelected mayor of Beverly Hills in April 2022. She announced the launch of a Real Time Watch Center to monitor the city's surveillance network and 'BHPD alert' which provides public safety information directly from the police department.

In October 2022, Mayor Bosse led the Beverly Hills City Council in the adoption of a resolution calling on President Biden, Secretary of State Blinken and Members of Congress to Increase Sanctions Against the Iranian Regime and for the United Nations to expel Iran from its Women’s Rights Commission.  The action follows the physical beating and deaths of Mahsa Amini, Sarina Esmaeilzadeh, Nika Shakarami, and others by Iran's morality police.

In December 2022, Mayor Bosse was invited to Athens, Greece to attend the second annual Mayors Summit Against Antisemitism. During the summit, Mayor Bosse joined municipal leaders from 53 cities and 23 countries and signed a historic declaration.  The “Joint Declaration of the Second Annual Mayors Summit Against Antisemitism” commits to “fight antisemitism in all its manifestations” by cooperating in the areas of education, raising awareness and promoting interfaith relations.

Philanthropy 
Bosse served as president of the Beverly Hills Education Foundation, from which she received the Spirit of Philanthropy Award.

Together with her husband, she is one of the largest donors to the Beverly Hills 9/11 Memorial Garden. She is also a founding member of the Police And Community Together organization. Bosse and her husband also donated US$100,000 to the Moriah Films division of the Simon Wiesenthal Center in honor of her mother's 90th birthday in 2013. The name "Rose Orenstein Toren" will appear in the film credits of all documentaries subsequently produced by the center. In 2013, the two also served on the Southern California Regional Council of Birthright Israel.

Bosse is co-founder and serves on the executive board of Visionary Women, a nonprofit organization that promotes women in leadership positions.  She is also a fellow of Vital Voices, a global women's leadership organization.

Personal life 
Bosse is married to Jon Bosse, the co-president and chief investment officer of NWQ, an affiliate of Nuveen Investments. They have two sons, Andrew and Adam. They reside in Beverly Hills, California.

References 

Living people
People from Rego Park, Queens
Beverly Hills High School alumni
University of Southern California alumni
Mayors of Beverly Hills, California
Jewish mayors of places in the United States
Women mayors of places in California
Jewish American philanthropists
Philanthropists from California
American people of Polish-Jewish descent
American Reform Jews
American women philanthropists
Philanthropists from New York (state)
Jewish American people in California politics
21st-century American Jews
21st-century American women
Date of birth missing (living people)
1961 births